The Bhutan Takin (Budorcas taxicolor whitei) is a vulnerable subspecies of Takin native to Bhutan, North Eastern India, Western part of China, and Tibet. The main threats to the Bhutan Takin are hunting and habitat loss.

Range, behaviour, and habitat
Takins are diurnal, active in the day, resting in the heat on particularly sunny days. Takin gather in small herds in winter and herds of up to a hundred individuals in the summer; in winter, they move to lower elevations and split into smaller herds of 10–50 individuals, mostly in the Gasa District. As is often seen in bison, old males are often solitary.

A study of the Bhutan Takin's seasonal movement and habitat use has been conducted by Jigme Dorji National Park staff which is thought to be the stronghold of the species in Bhutan. An earlier study of its diet on its summer range showed that the takin is a generalist browser foraging on numerous shrubs and forbs.

In China, the species is known to inhabit from south of the Yarlung Tsangpo River on the southern-facing side of the eastern Himalayas, to the westerly bend of the river. In India it occurs in Arunachal Pradesh, West Bengal, and Sikkim.

See also
List of endangered and protected species of China

References

Bhutan takin
Mammals of Bhutan
Fauna of Sikkim
Fauna of Eastern Himalaya
National symbols of Bhutan
Bhutan takin